The 2001 Trophée Lalique was the fourth event of six in the 2001–02 ISU Grand Prix of Figure Skating, a senior-level international invitational competition series. It was held at the Palais Omnisports Paris Bercy in Paris on November 15–18. Medals were awarded in the disciplines of men's singles, ladies' singles, pair skating, and ice dancing. Skaters earned points toward qualifying for the 2001–02 Grand Prix Final.

The competition was named after the Lalique company, which was its chief sponsor at the time.

Results

Men

Ladies

Pairs

Ice dancing

External links
 2001 Trophée Lalique
 Completed results
 https://web.archive.org/web/20120324011356/http://ww2.isu.org/news/gptl.html
 https://web.archive.org/web/20120324011430/http://ww2.isu.org/news/gptl1.html
 https://web.archive.org/web/20120324011438/http://ww2.isu.org/news/gptl2.html
 https://web.archive.org/web/20120324011444/http://ww2.isu.org/news/gptl3.html

Trophée Lalique, 2001
Internationaux de France
Figure
Trophée Lalique
Trophée Lalique
Figure skating in Paris
International figure skating competitions hosted by France